Hirschhorn is derived from German composite word "Hirsch" (deer) and "Horn" (horn), part of a deer's antlers. A variation is Hirshhorn. It may refer to:

 Hirschhorn (Neckar), a town in Hesse, Germany
 Hirschhorn, Rhineland-Palatinate, a municipality in Rhineland-Palatinate, Germany
 Hirshhorn Museum and Sculpture Garden in Washington, D.C.
 Alternate of Hartshorn
It is also a surname. Some people with this name include:
 Joel Hirschhorn (1938–2005), American songwriter
 Joseph Hirshhorn (1899–1981), Latvian-American entrepreneur, financier and art collector (also see Hirshhorn Museum and Sculpture Garden)
 Kurt Hirschhorn, researcher of Wolf–Hirschhorn syndrome
 Philippe Hirschhorn (1946–1996), Latvian violinist
 Samuel Hirszhorn (1876–1942), Polish writer, journalist, and politician
 Sheea Herschorn (1893–1969), Chief Rabbi of Montreal
 Thomas Hirschhorn (born 1957), Swiss installation artist
 Robert Hirschhorn (Born 1956), American Lawyer and Jury Consultant
Also:
Hirschhorn tiling, a non-periodic tessellation.